The 2015 Southeastern Louisiana Lions football team represented Southeastern Louisiana University in the 2015 NCAA Division I FCS football season. The Lions were led by fourth-year head coach Ron Roberts and played their home games at Strawberry Stadium. They were a member of the Southland Conference. They finished the season 4–7, 3–6 in Southland play to finish in a three way tie for eighth place.

Previous season
The Lions tied for the Southland Conference championship.  They finished the season 9–4 overall, 7–1 in conference play, and lost the first playoff game to Sam Houston State 17–21.

Schedule
Source:

Game summaries

@ Northwestern State

Sources:

Florida Tech

Sources:

@ Ohio

Sources:

Lamar

Sources:

@ McNeese State

Sources:

Stephen F. Austin

Sources:

@ Houston Baptist

Sources:

@ Central Arkansas

Sources:

Incarnate Word

Sources:

@ Abilene Christian

Sources:

Nicholls

Sources:

Ranking movements

References

Southeastern Louisiana
Southeastern Louisiana Lions football seasons
Southeastern Louisiana Lions football